Nezumi may refer to the following:

Real life
 The Japanese word 鼠  meaning "rat" or "mouse"
 Nezumi Kozō was the nickname of a thief in the 19th century
 Previous name of Yuuki Matsuda

Software
 Now-defunct Ragnarok Online server emulator released under the GNU General Public License

Fiction
 Nezumi, race of anthropomorphic rat creatures in the Magic: The Gathering and Legend of the Five Rings trading card games
 Nezumi, one of the two main characters of the novel, manga and anime No. 6
 Nezumi (One Piece), a minor character in the Japanese anime and manga One Piece
 Nezumi, a character in Majisuka Gakuen, portrayed by Mayu Watanabe.